KIF Örebro DFF is a Swedish women's football club based in Örebro. Founded in 1980 as the women's football section of multi-sports association Karlslunds IF, the club's first team currently plays in the Damallsvenskan, the top level of the women's football pyramid in Sweden. The club also operates two reserve teams at the under-19 and under-17 levels, as well as a youth academy.

KIF Örebro play their home games at Behrn Arena, which they share with the men's football club Örebro SK.

History
KIF Örebro was founded in 1980.

In 2014, the first team enjoyed their best ever season, finishing second in the league and qualifying for the UEFA Women's Champions League for the first time in club history.

Players and staff

First-team squad

Former players

Notable former players include Americans Kristine Lilly, Kate Markgraf, and Christie Welsh; they played for the club in 2004 under Pia Sundhage.

Coaching staff

Record in UEFA Women's Champions League
All results (away, home and aggregate) list Örebro's goal tally first.

a First leg.

References

External links

 Official website 

 
Women's football clubs in Sweden
Sport in Örebro
1980 establishments in Sweden
Damallsvenskan teams
Association football clubs established in 1980